Apostolicam Actuositatem (Apostolic Activity), also known as the "Decree on the Apostolate of the Laity", is one of the 16 magisterial documents of the Second Vatican Council.  

The final text was approved on 10 November, 1965 by a vote of 2,201 to 2. On 18 November, 1965, it was promulgated by Pope Paul VI, after another vote, this time of 2,340 to 2.

The purpose of the document was to encourage and guide lay Catholics in their Christian service. In this decree the Council sought to describe the nature, character, and diversity of the lay apostolate, to state its basic principles, and to give pastoral directives for its more effective exercise. The specific objectives of lay ministry are: evangelization and sanctification, renewal of the temporal order whereby Christ is first in all things, and charitable works and social aid.  The decree quotes Colossians 3:17: "Whatever you do in word or work, do all in the name of the Lord Jesus Christ, giving thanks to God the Father through Him".

Background 
Apostolicam Actuositatem follows upon Lumen gentium, the "Dogmatic Constitution on the Church", of 21 November 1964, which in Chapter IV, discusses the laity, by which they mean all the faithful except those in Holy Orders or religious institutes. "They live in the ordinary circumstances of family and social life, from which the very web of their existence is woven.  ...led by the spirit of the Gospel they may work for the sanctification of the world from within as a leaven. In this way they may make Christ known to others, especially by the testimony of a life resplendent in faith, hope and charity.

After 
The Pontifical Council for the Laity had its foundation in Vatican II's Apostolicam Actuositatem, §26. The Pontifical council was created in January 1967 by Pope Paul VI's motu proprio Catholicam Christi Ecclesiam. In December 1976, the council was included as a permanent fixture of the Roman Curia. In September 2016, its functions were shifted to the new Dicastery for the Laity, Family and Life.

See also 
 Associations of the faithful
 Christifideles laici
 Lay ecclesial ministry
 List of Ecclesial movements

References

Further reading 
 Francis Cardinal Arinze, The Layperson's Distinctive Role, Ignatius Press, 2013

External links 
 English translation of text at the Vatican
 Original Latin text at EWTN

Decrees
Documents of the Second Vatican Council
Latin texts
Pontifical Council for the Laity
1965 in Christianity
1965 documents